Abbas Afridi may refer to:

 Abbas Afridi (cricketer) (born 2001), Pakistani cricketer
 Abbas Khan Afridi, Pakistani politician